Calosoma raffrayi is a species of ground beetle in the subfamily of Carabinae. It was described by Fairmaire in 1883.

References

raffrayi
Beetles described in 1883